The Boeotian War broke out in 378 BC as the result of a revolt in Thebes against Sparta.  The war saw Thebes become dominant in the Greek World at the expense of Sparta. However, by the end of the war Thebes’ greatest leaders, Pelopidas and Epaminondas, were both dead and Thebes power already waning, allowing for the Rise of Macedon.

Background 
After the end of the Corinthian War, which had seen many of Sparta’s allies abandon her, Sparta began reconstructing its hegemony and punishing many disloyal allies. In 385 BC Sparta attacked Mantinea claiming they had failed to fulfil their allied obligations. When Sparta took the city they split it into four settlements, as that was what it had used to be. In the north the city of Olynthus grew in power and violated the terms agreed upon at the end of the Corinthian War. Because of this Sparta sent an army against the city under the command of Phoebidas. When the army was in Boeotia around 383 or 382 BC, Leontiades, who was leader of the oligarchic party in Thebes, asked Phoebidas to occupy the Theban Citadel as Leontiades felt threatened by the democratic party. The Spartans were ruled by kings and, therefore, were supportive of oligarchic governments in other Greek cities. Because of this Phoebidas agreed, occupying the city and practically taking control of Thebes.

Upon the seizure of the Theban citadel by the Spartans, Pelopidas and other leading Theban democrats fled to Athens where Pelopidas took the lead in a conspiracy to liberate Thebes. In 379 BC the democratic party surprised and killed their chief political opponents in Thebes (members of the aristocratic party that supported the Spartans), and roused the people against the Spartan garrison, which surrendered to an army gathered by Pelopidas.

Course

Outbreak (378 BC)
Sparta immediately sent against Thebes a force under one of their kings, Cleombrotus, in the middle of winter. As the border fort of Eleutherae was held by an Athenian garrison, he was forced to enter Boeotia through Mount Cithaeron, where he wiped out a force of Theban democrats. After passing through the allied cities of Plataea and Thespiae, Cleombrotus's force camped at Cynoscephalae (6 km west of Thebes) to await events. The Athenians were alarmed at Cleombrotus's presence nearby, and, seeking to placate Sparta, immediately punished their own generals who had aided the Theban coup. It was probably around this time, likely due to fear that Athens would not offer support, that Thebes sent an embassy to Sparta, offering to rejoin the Peloponnesian League in return for recognition of its new government. Cleombrotus inflicted no damage to Theban territory, as he apparently hoped for a reconciliation, but the government at Sparta, led by the other king, the anti-Theban hardliner Agesilaus, would have nothing less than the punishment of the coup leaders and the restoration of a pro-Spartan regime, terms which Thebes rejected.

Whatever negotiations Cleombrotus may have initiated on his own came to nothing, and, once it became apparent after 16 days that neither Thebes nor Athens would offer a challenge, he ended the campaign, retiring unhindered by way of Creusis and Aigosthena. Although Athens had not yet committed itself, it was soon the target of an act of Spartan aggression which brought it firmly to the Theban camp. Sphodrias, the harmost (governor) whom Cleombrotus had left in command of a Spartan remnant garrisoned at Thespiae, launched an officially unauthorized nighttime raid on the Athenian port of Piraeus. The attack was a fiasco, as the Spartans were still a distance away from their objective when dawn broke, and Sphodrias had to content himself with plundering the Attic countryside while retreating. According to varying accounts, Sphodrias had either been enticed by a Theban bribe, aimed at forcing Athens to become more belligerent, or acted upon secret orders from Cleombrotus. A Spartan delegation in Athens, which had been probably sent earlier by Agesilaus to assess Athenian intentions, professed ignorance of the attack, but Sphodrias was then unexpectedly acquitted by the home government. Athens declared that Sparta had broken the peace and prepared for war.

Expeditions of Agesilaus (378–377 BC)
Sparta called upon all its allies and, led by Agesilaus, invaded Boeotia in the spring of 378. The Thebans and their commander, Gorgidas, had decided to resist the Spartans and screen their city by setting up, probably with aid of the Athenians, a continuous trench and palisade that stretched from the border with Thespiae in the west, alongside the northern bank of the Asopus in the south, to the border with Tanagra in the east. Agesilaus probed the stockade looking for weak points, moving his camp around it and devastating the land outside, while the Thebans and Athenians sent out repeated forays to harass his forces. After getting a measure of the defenders' movements and having them grow used to his own movements, the King surprised them by marching at daybreak and crossed the stockade at an undefended position before the enemy could reach him. Agesilaus then encountered a Theban and Athenian force set up on a defensive position in a hill some  km southwest of Thebes. He dispersed their light troops and brought his army uphill to threaten the enemy, but the latter, led by the Athenian Chabrias, defiantly stood their ground in a defensive and provocative manner. Unwilling to charge uphill against a strong opponent, Agesilaus decided not to engage the enemy and, his bluff called, continued devastating Theban territory, reaching the walls of the city itself. After Agesilaus's departure, Phoebidas, whom he had left as commander of the garrison at Thespiae, continued raiding enemy territory, which prompted Gorgidas to bring his entire Theban force and plunder the surroundings of Thespiae in retaliation. Gorgidas was then surprised and put to flight by Phoebidas, but successfully regrouped at the Thespios (Kanavari) river valley and counterattacked his pursuers there, killing Phoebidas and chasing the Spartans back to Thespiae.

In 377, Agesilaus, once again in command of the Peloponnesian forces, implemented a ruse against the Theban army to bypass their stockade unopposed. After arriving at Plataea, he sent word to Thespiae requesting that a market be set up for his troops, but, once the Thebans went that way to await his arrival, he instead marched eastwards at dawn to Erythrae and Scolus, slipping past the stockade at an undefended point. He began laying waste to enemy territory which had not been ravaged the previous year, before reaching the Spartan-held territory of Tanagra. Turning back westward, Agesilaus found the Theban army formed up in a hill named Graos Stethos (probably the modern Golemi), but he ignored them and marched straight to Thebes itself. Fearing for their city's safety, the Thebans abandoned their hill and marched back home by way of Potniae, but despite being harried by the Spartans they reached Thebes first. As Agesilaus retired to Thespiae, his Olynthian cavalry inflicted some casualties on a group of enemy peltasts after the Athenian Chabrias refused to risk his hoplites in support.

Although Agesilaus's scorched earth tactics caused severe food shortages at Thebes, his campaigns accomplished little else. He had failed to decisively engage the enemy or to capture Thebes, and his depredations had the effect of strengthening the resolve of the affected Boeotian communities against Sparta. Sparta's allies meanwhile grew increasingly dissatisfied with the constant and fruitless campaigning. A change in policy was made after the aged Agesilaus, while on a pause at Megara on the way back to Sparta, became afflicted with an illness which left him incapacited for years. Encouraged by the other king, Cleombrotus, Sparta shifted its focus from Thebes on land to Athens at sea.

Spartan setbacks
An expedition in 376 BC led by King Cleombrotus was blocked at the passes of Cithaeron. As the Spartans failed to get over the Cithaeron Mountains, this gave the Thebans the chance to take the attack to the Spartans, and in doing so they conquered the Spartans' remaining strongholds in Boeotia while the Spartan base in Thespiae was also lost. The Spartans were only left with some land in the south and Orchomenus in the north-west.

Because the Spartans were having a hard time attacking Thebes over land, they decided to change their strategy and rather use a naval force to try to block support for the Athenians. In response, the Athenians sent a powerful fleet towards Sparta. The Spartan general Pollis then led his small fleet to try to stop the siege, but was killed during a naval battle against the Athenian general Chabrias. This naval victory was the first ever victory by an Athenian naval fleet since the Peloponnesian War. Later in 376 BC Chabrias raided Laconia, and possibly reached Sellasia, which is to the north-east of Sparta. In 375 BC Athens mounted two successful expeditions - one into the northern Aegean under Chabrias and a second which sailed around the Peloponnese to western Greece.  This force was led by Timotheos, son of Conon, who won the battle of Alyzeia in Acarnania.

Peace conference

In 375 BC there was a renewal of the King's Peace, but this lasted but a few months.  The capture of Plataea by the Thebans put the Theban-Athenian Alliance under strain, as the  Plataeans were expelled from their city and found asylum in Athens, where they were a strong voice against Thebes. Though the alliance held, Athens insisted on negotiations with Sparta.  A peace treaty was agreed but significant disagreements arose at the treaty signing. Epaminondas insisted that he should sign for the Boeotians as a whole rather than just for Thebes.  In response, the Spartan king Agesilaus struck the name of Thebes off the list of signatories.  Both sides then left the conference and prepared for renewed hostilities.

As a result of the failure to come to terms with Thebes, the Spartans under Cleombrotus marched against Thebes in 371 BC; however, they were defeated at Leuctra by the Boeotians led by the Thebans. Due to this battle, Spartan supremacy was effectively overthrown and a new era of Theban hegemony was set up.

Notes

Sources
 
 
 
 Nigel Kennell, Spartans, a new history, 2010
 Henry Smith Williams (Ed.) The Historians' History of the World, vol 4

Wars involving ancient Greece
Wars involving Sparta
370s BC conflicts
Wars involving Athens
Ancient Boeotia